Mireille Flour (29 April 1906 in Marseille – 1984 was a French classical harpist, naturalised Belgian.

Biography 
After studying at the conservatoire de Marseille, then the conservatoire de Paris for half a century, Flour was a striking figure of the harp in Belgium. She established the "Quatuor de harpes Mireille Flour", which enjoyed a fairly significant success.

Her very extensive repertoire led her to play with many orchestras. Her discography is relatively important and varied. Composer Pierre Bartholomée dedicated her a piece entitled Catalogue pour quatuor de harpes.

References

External links 
 Mireille Flour on data.bnf.fr
 Mireille Flour's discography on Discogs
 Joseph Jongen (1873–1953): Concerto pour harpe et orchestre (1944) 1/2 with Mireille Flour as the harpist

1906 births
Musicians from Marseille
1984 deaths
French classical harpists
Belgian harpists
Academic staff of the Royal Conservatory of Brussels
20th-century classical musicians